Sunshield removable covers for tanks, making them resemble trucks, in Operation Bertram
 Sunshield meaning a Space sunshade
 Sunshield of the James Webb Space Telescope